Elections for local government were held in Northern Ireland on Thursday 5 May 2011, contesting 582 seats in all.

European Union and Commonwealth citizens aged 18 or over on election day were entitled to vote. The deadline for voters to register to vote in the elections was midnight on Thursday 14 April 2011. A total of 1,210,009 were eligible to vote, and 55.7% of the electorate turned out.

All voters were required to present one piece of photographic ID in order to cast a vote at the polling station – accepted forms of ID are an electoral identity card, a photographic NI or GB driving licence, a European Union member-state passport, a Translink 60+ SmartPass, a Translink Senior SmartPass, a Translink Blind Person's SmartPass or a Translink War Disabled SmartPass. Voters who didn't have an accepted type of photographic ID had until Friday 22 April 2011 to apply for an electoral identity card from the Electoral Office.

The elections were originally scheduled to take place in 2009. In 2008, Minister of the Environment Arlene Foster requested that they be postponed until 2011 to allow the implementation of a proposed reform of local government in Northern Ireland, which would have reduced the number of local councils from 26 to 11. In February 2009, an order was made, postponing the election, and councillors' terms of office were extended until the fourth day after the election day in 2011.

In June 2010, the proposed reforms were abandoned, and it was confirmed that the 2011 elections would be to the existing 26 councils. There was also an election to the Northern Ireland Assembly and a referendum on voting reform on the same day. The reforms have since been adopted and the 2014 Northern Ireland local elections were for the 11 new districts.

Results

By council

Councils

Antrim

Ards

Armagh

Ballymena

Ballymoney

Banbridge

Belfast

Carrickfergus

Castlereagh

Coleraine

Cookstown

Craigavon

Derry

Down

Dungannon

Fermanagh

Larne

Limavady

Lisburn

Magherafelt

Moyle

Newry and Mourne

Newtownabbey

North Down

Omagh

Strabane

References

 
2011